In mathematics, continuous geometry is an analogue of complex projective geometry introduced  by , where instead of the dimension of a subspace being in a discrete set , it can be an element of the unit interval . Von Neumann was motivated by his discovery of von Neumann algebras with a dimension function taking a continuous range of dimensions, and the first example of a continuous geometry other than projective space was the projections of the hyperfinite type II factor.

Definition

Menger and Birkhoff gave axioms for projective geometry in terms of the lattice of linear subspaces of projective space. Von Neumann's axioms for continuous geometry are a weakened form of these axioms.

A continuous geometry is a lattice L with the following properties

L is modular.
L is complete.
The lattice operations ∧, ∨ satisfy a certain continuity property,
, where A is a directed set and if  then , and the same condition with ∧ and ∨ reversed.
Every element in L has a complement (not necessarily unique).
L is irreducible: this means that the only elements with unique complements are 0 and 1.

Examples

Finite-dimensional complex projective space, or rather its set of linear subspaces, is a continuous geometry, with dimensions taking values in the discrete set 
The projections of a finite type II von Neumann algebra form a continuous geometry with dimensions taking values in the unit interval .
 showed that any orthocomplemented complete modular lattice is a continuous geometry.
If V is a vector space over a field (or division ring) F, then there is a natural map from the lattice PG(V) of subspaces of V to the lattice of subspaces of  that multiplies dimensions by 2. So we can take a direct limit of

This has a dimension function taking values all dyadic rationals between 0 and 1.

Dimension

These results are similar to, and were motivated by, von Neumann's work on projections in von Neumann algebras.

Two elements a and b of L are called perspective, written ,  if they have a common complement. This is an equivalence relation on L; the proof that it is transitive is quite hard.

(This need not hold for all a in A and b in B.)

The dimension function D from L to the unit interval is defined as follows. 
Otherwise the sum  is not defined. For a positive integer n, the product nA is defined to be the sum of n copies of A, if this sum is defined.
D(a) is defined to be , where {a} and {1} are the equivalence classes containing a and 1.

The image of D can be the whole unit interval, or the set of numbers  for some positive integer n. Two elements of L have the same image under D if and only if they are perspective, so it gives an injection from the equivalence classes to a subset of the unit interval. The dimension function D has the properties:
If  then 
D(a ∨ b) + D(a ∧ b) = D(a) + D(b)
 if and only if , and  if and only if

Coordinatization theorem

In projective geometry, the Veblen–Young theorem states that a projective geometry of dimension at least 3 is isomorphic to the projective geometry of a vector space over a division ring. This can be restated as saying that the subspaces in the projective geometry correspond to the principal right ideals of a matrix algebra over a division ring.

Neumann generalized this to continuous geometries, and more generally to complemented modular lattices,  as follows . His theorem states that if a complemented modular lattice L has order at least 4, then the elements of L correspond to the principal right ideals of a von Neumann regular ring. The order of a lattice need not be unique; for example, any lattice has order 1. The condition that the lattice has order  at least 4 corresponds to the condition that the dimension is at least 3 in the Veblen–Young theorem, as a projective space has dimension at least 3 if and only if it has a set of at least  4 independent points.

Conversely, the principal right ideals of a von Neumann regular ring form a complemented modular lattice .

Suppose that  R is a von Neumann regular ring and L its lattice of principal right ideals, so that L is a complemented modular lattice. Neumann showed that L is a continuous geometry if and only if R is an irreducible complete rank ring.

References

Projective geometry
Von Neumann algebras
Lattice theory